Ranchi Rays (RCR) is an Indian field hockey team based in Ranchi, Jharkhand that competes in the Hockey India League (HIL). It was announced as the newest team to replace the defunct Ranchi Rhinos on 25 October 2014. It is owned by Indian cricketer Mahendra Singh Dhoni.

History
In September 2014 it was announced that the inaugural champions of the Hockey India League, Ranchi Rhinos, had withdrawn from the league after the owners, Patel-Uniexcel Group, had come to a disagreement with Hockey India over some differences. A month later it was announced that a new ownership group made of Indian conglomerate Individuals, Rahul Srivastava, and current India cricketer, Mahendra Singh Dhoni, had bought the franchise rights to a new Ranchi franchise which they named the Ranchi Rays.

Stadium

2017 squad

Fixtures and results

2015

 Goals For: 25 (2.08 per match)
 Goals Against: 21 (1.75 per match)
 Most Goals: Ashley Jackson (12)

2016

 Goals For: 43 (4.03 per match)
 Goals Against: 35 (2.91 per match)

2017

 Goals For: 12 (3 per match)
 Goals Against: 9 (2.25 per match)

See also
 Hockey India League
 Ranchi Rhinos

References

External links
 Page on Hockey India

 
2014 establishments in Jharkhand
Sport in Ranchi
Sports clubs established in 2014
Indian field hockey clubs